Katherine Winder Cochella (born 23 April 1992) is a Peruvian badminton player. She educated at the Universidad del Pacífico Lima, and in 2015, Winder competed at the Pan Am Games in the women's and mixed doubles event. In the women's doubles she placed 7th, while in the mixed doubles she won the bronze medal partnered with Mario Cuba. In 2010, she won the gold medal at the South American Games in the women's doubles event teamed up with Claudia Zornoza.

Achievements

Pan American Games 
Mixed doubles

Pan Am Championships 
Women's doubles

Mixed doubles

South American Games 
Women's doubles

BWF International Challenge/Series 
Women's singles

Women's doubles

Mixed doubles

  BWF International Challenge tournament
  BWF International Series tournament
  BWF Future Series tournament

References

External links 
 

1992 births
Living people
Peruvian female badminton players
Badminton players at the 2010 Summer Youth Olympics
Badminton players at the 2015 Pan American Games
Pan American Games bronze medalists for Peru
Pan American Games medalists in badminton
Medalists at the 2015 Pan American Games
South American Games gold medalists for Peru
South American Games medalists in badminton
21st-century Peruvian women